Below is the professional boxing record of Len Johnson.

Notes

References

English Roman Catholics
English people of Irish descent
People of Sierra Leone Creole descent
British male writers
20th-century British male writers
20th-century British non-fiction writers
British pan-Africanists
English male boxers
Boxers from Manchester
People from Clayton
England Boxing champions
Welterweight boxers
Middleweight boxers
Light-heavyweight boxers
Heavyweight boxers
Commonwealth Boxing Council champions
English humanitarians
English communists
English socialists
British civil rights activists
Communist Party of Great Britain members
British human rights activists
Community organizing
Nonviolence advocates
British community activists
Black British activists
Civil rights movement
Activists for African-American civil rights
Anti-imperialism